The Schweizer SGS 1-34 is a United States Standard Class, single-seat, high-wing glider built by Schweizer Aircraft of Elmira, New York.

The 1-34 was designed over a number of years in the mid-1960s and first flew in 1969.

By the time the 1-34 was introduced it was no longer competitive in the Standard Class, but has proven very successful as a club aircraft.

Design and development 
The 1-34 was designed over several years to spread out the development costs. At the time the design work on the aircraft was started the Standard Class was new and described a very simple aircraft with terminal velocity dive brakes, fixed landing gear and no water ballast. By the time the 1-34 had flown in 1969 the Standard Class rules had changed to allow essentially unrestricted sailplanes with a 15-metre (49.2 feet) wingspan.

The SGS 1-34 is of all metal aluminum semi-monocoque construction. All surfaces are aluminum covered, with the exception of the rudder which is covered in aircraft fabric.

The 1-34 has air brakes capable of limiting the terminal velocity in a vertical dive to the maximum safe speed as specified in the original Standard Class rules. Developing and testing these proved expensive and time-consuming and this also extended the aircraft's development time.

The 1-34 was the first Schweizer design to depart from using a NACA airfoil. The 1-34 has no wing washout and instead uses a Wortmann FX 61-163 airfoil at the wing root transitioning to a Wortmann FX 61-126 airfoil at the wing tip. The tip airfoil stalls at a higher angle of attack, ensuring that the wing root stalls first.

The one company concession to the changing Standard Class rules was the development of a retractable landing gear version of the 1-34, designated as the SGS 1-34R.

The 1-34 also features in-flight adjustable rudder pedals and a two-way adjustable seat to accommodate pilots of different heights.

The 1-34 was flown in Standard Class competitions, but was out-performed by the new fiberglass European gliders, such as the Glasflügel H-201 Standard Libelle.

During the protracted development process, Schweizer Aircraft was aware that the 1-34 would be overtaken by the changes in class rules and also by the performance of the newer European fiberglass sailplanes, but continued development of the SGS 1-34 anyway. The company identified that there was demand from private owners and especially clubs and commercial operations for a simple, rugged single seat glider with greater performance than the 1-26.

In service the 1-34 has proven to be a popular club aircraft and ideal for the completion of badge flights. If a greater number of 1-34s had been built, Schweizer indicated that it would have become another one-design class, similar to the 1-26.

The 1-34 type certificate is currently held by K & L Soaring of Cayuta, New York. K & L Soaring now provides all parts and support for the Schweizer line of sailplanes.

Operational history
At least two 1-34s have been highly modified. Bob Park's 1-34R, registered N17974, was damaged when a hurricane passed through Georgia and resulted in a hangar collapse. The 1-34R was rebuilt with a V-tail and ballast tanks mounted in the wings that hold 230 lbs (105 kg) of water. The aircraft was subsequently registered in the experimental Racing – Exhibition category.

A modified SGS 1-34 airframe with tricycle landing gear and powered by a Lycoming TIO-360 piston engine was used as the basis for the pilotless Martin Marietta Model 845 prototype, an entry in the early 1970s USAF Compass Dwell endurance UAV program.

In May 2008 there were still 63 1-34s and six 1-34Rs registered in the USA and 5 SGS 1-34s in Canada.

The USAF designation for the SGS 1-34 is TG-6.

Variants 
1-34
The original fixed landing gear 1-34 model was certified under type certificate G3EA on 16 October 1969.
1-34R
The retractable gear 1-34R was added to type certificate G3EA on 15 June 1971.
Park 1-34R Modified
The new tail allowed  of lead nose ballast to be removed. The aircraft flew three diamond goal and gold distance flights in August 1983.

Aircraft on display
US Southwest Soaring Museum

Specifications

See also

References

External links 

 Soaring Society of Boulder - 1-34 data and photos
 SGS 1-34 Flight, Erection and Inspection Manual

1960s United States sailplanes
Schweizer aircraft
Glider aircraft
High-wing aircraft
Aircraft first flown in 1969